Pasar Minggu is a district of South Jakarta, Special Capital Region of Jakarta, Indonesia. The area is known for its traditional Sunday market, famous for the fruit market. Historically, Pasar Minggu is a fruit cultivation area developed by the Dutch government during the colonial period. The central point of the cultivation area is the traditional market of Pasar Minggu, located in what is now Pasar Minggu Kelurahan. Teak forest could also be found in Pasar Minggu district, notably around Jati Padang (Javanese for "bright teak") Kelurahan. Most of these areas has been converted into residential area as Jakarta grow southward. 

The boundary of Pasar Minggu is Kemang Selatan Road - Warung Jati Timur Road - Kalibata Timur Road to the north, Ciliwung River to the east, and Krukut River to the west.

The southern portion of Jakarta Outer Ring Road passed through Pasar Minggu district.

Government
The district of Pasar Minggu is divided into seven kelurahan or administrative villages: 
Pejaten Barat - area code 12510
Pejaten Timur - area code 12510
Pasar Minggu - area code 12520
Kebagusan - area code 12520
Jati Padang - area code 12540
Ragunan - area code 12550
Cilandak Timur - area code 12560

History
The name Pasar Minggu derives from Pasar Minggu, a state-owned market located in the administrative village of the same name. The neighborhood of Pasar Minggu was – in the 17th-century – an ommelanden of Batavia located uphill. The land is located between the Ciliwung to the east and the stream of Mampang.

In the 18th-century, two parcels of land in what is now the district of Pasar Minggu was recorded as the property of Diogo Merendo and Simão Rodrigo who bought the land in mid 17th-century.

Pasar Minggu Market

Before 1920, market activity in the area was centered in Kampung Lio, closer to the west bank of the Ciliwung. The market opened every Sunday morning, hence the name Pasar Minggu, Malay for "Sunday Market". Pasar Minggu mainly consisted of bamboo-structured stalls. At this time, the market was also known for its gambling activities and a ronggeng performance known as Doger.

In 1920, the location of the market was shifted closer to the railway line. Chinese merchants began setting up their activity in Pasar Minggu, mainly on rice-selling.

In 1930, a land to the west of Jalan Pasar Minggu (formerly the property of Dales, who took residence in Tanjung West) was opened by the colonial government to establish a more permanent building for the market. The first structure built for the market was a simple steel structure topped with zinc roof. The new market sold a variety of daily necessities e.g. clothing, as well as fruits, mostly collected from the surrounding orchards. Pasar Minggu was also set to open every day. Despite this, Pasar Minggu was still busier on Sunday. In 1931, the road connecting Pasar Minggu with Manggarai was paved, giving more access for people to Pasar Minggu.

Following the expansion of the boundary of the city of Jakarta, the area of Pasar Minggu was planned as a residential area. The plan converts some of the existing orchards into residential.

The present Pasar Minggu building was inaugurated by the governor of Jakarta at that time Governor Tjokropranolo in 1984.

List of important places

Ministry of Agriculture Building Complex
Kemang Selatan, the southern portion of Kemang.
Pasar Minggu market, bus terminal, and railway station.
Ragunan Zoological Garden
Republika building

See also

References

Cited works

External links

Districts of Jakarta